Efren Pablioto Cruz (born 27 May 1981) is a former English List A cricketer. A right-handed batsman who played primarily as a wicketkeeper, he was born at Hammersmith, London.

Cruz made his List-A debut for Surrey Cricket Board against Huntingdonshire in the 2nd round of the 2001 Cheltenham & Gloucester Trophy.  Between 2001 and 2002, he played 5 List-A matches, the last of which for the Surrey Cricket Board came against the Essex Cricket Board at Chelmsford in the 2nd round of the 2003 Cheltenham & Gloucester Trophy which was played in 2002.  In his 5 List-A matches, he scored 24 runs at a batting average of 8.00, with a high score of 11.  Behind the stumps he took a single catch and made 2 stumpings.

Between 1999 and 2000, he also represented the Surrey Second XI in the Second XI Championship and Second XI Trophy a combined total of 12 times.

References

External links
Efren Cruz at Cricinfo
Efren Cruz at CricketArchive

1981 births
Living people
People from Hammersmith
Cricketers from Greater London
English cricketers
Surrey Cricket Board cricketers
Wicket-keepers